The 2017 Portland State Vikings football team represented Portland State University during the 2017 NCAA Division I FCS football season. They were led by third-year head coach Bruce Barnum and played their home games at Providence Park, with one home game at Hillsboro Stadium. They were a member of the Big Sky Conference. They finished the season 0–11, 0–8 in Big Sky play to finish in last place.

Schedule

Despite also being a member of the Big Sky Conference, the game with UC Davis on September 16 is considered a non-conference game.

Game summaries

at BYU

at Oregon State

UC Davis

Montana

at Montana State

Northern Arizona

at Idaho State

North Dakota

at Cal Poly

Weber State

at Eastern Washington–The Dam Cup

References

Portland State
Portland State Vikings football seasons
College football winless seasons
Portland State Vikings football
Portland State Vikings football